was a member of the Supreme Court of Japan.

References

Supreme Court of Japan justices
1944 births
2010 deaths
Deaths from pneumonia in Japan